De-Excluded Area may refer to:

 De-Excluded Area D.G. Khan Tehsil
 De-Excluded Area Rajanpur Tehsil